The Myoko Maru (Kanji:) was a 4,103-gross register ton cargo ship built by Mitsubishi Jukogyo Kabushiki Kaisha, Yokohama for Nippon Yusen Kabushiki Kaisha in 1939. She was transferred to Toa Kaiun Kabushiki Kaisha in 1939 and was requisitioned in 1941 by the Imperial Japanese Army during World War II.

Fate
On 7 January 1943, Myoko Maru was damaged by United States aircraft of the 49th Fighter Group off Lae, New Guinea, whereupon it was steered up on the beach near Malahang at 06°49'S, 147°04'E, where it was bombed again the next day and destroyed. The wreck was known as the "Malahang Wreck". During the war, the ship provided accommodation for thousands of American and Australian troops, moving north. After the wart the ship was used by John F. Hoile who turned the hull of the ship into an engineering workshop. By this time the ship was entirely beached.

Notes

External links
Chronological List of Japanese Merchant Vessel Losses

Ships of the NYK Line
1939 ships
Ships built by Mitsubishi Heavy Industries
Ships of the Imperial Japanese Army
Ships sunk by US aircraft
Shipwrecks of Papua New Guinea
Maritime incidents in January 1943
Merchant ships of Japan
World War II merchant ships of Japan